In computer hardware, a port serves as an interface between the computer and other computers or peripheral devices. In computer terms, a port generally refers to the part of a computing device available for connection to peripherals such as input and output devices. Computer ports have many uses, to connect a monitor, webcam, speakers, or other  peripheral devices. On the physical layer, a computer port is a specialized outlet on a piece of equipment to which a plug or cable connects. Electronically, the several conductors where the port and cable contacts connect, provide a method to transfer signals between devices.

Bent pins are easier to replace on a cable than on a connector attached to a computer, so it was common to use connectors for the fixed side of an interface.

Computer ports in common use cover a wide variety of shapes such as round (PS/2, etc.), rectangular (FireWire, etc.), square (Telephone plug), trapezoidal (D-Sub — the old printer port was a DB-25), etc.  There is some standardization to physical properties and function.  For instance, most computers have a keyboard port (currently a Universal Serial Bus USB-like outlet referred to as USB Port), into which the keyboard is connected.

Physically identical connectors may be used for widely different standards, especially on older personal computer systems, or systems not generally designed according to the current Microsoft Windows compatibility guides. For example, a  9-pin D-subminiature connector on the original IBM PC could have been used for monochrome video, color analog video (in two incompatible standards), a joystick interface, or a MIDI musical instrument digital control interface. The original IBM PC also had two identical 5 pin DIN connectors, one used for the keyboard, the second for a cassette recorder interface; the two were not interchangeable. The smaller mini-DIN connector has been variously used for the keyboard and two different kinds of mouse; older Macintosh family computers used the mini-DIN for a serial port or for a keyboard connector with different standards than the IBM-descended systems.

Electrical signal transfer
Electronically, hardware ports can almost always be divided into two groups based on the signal transfer:
Analog ports
Digital ports:
 Parallel ports send multiple bits at the same time over several sets of wires.
 Serial ports send and receive one bit at a time via a single wire pair (Ground and +/-).

After ports are connected, they typically require handshaking, where transfer type, transfer rate, and other necessary information is shared before data is sent.

Hot-swappable ports can be connected while equipment is running.  Almost all ports on personal computers are hot-swappable.

Plug-and-play ports are designed so that the connected devices automatically start handshaking as soon as the hot-swapping is done.  USB ports and FireWire ports are plug-and-play.

Auto-detect or auto-detection ports are usually plug-and-play, but they offer another type of convenience.  An auto-detect port may automatically determine what kind of device has been attached, but it also determines what purpose the port itself should have.  For example, some sound cards allow plugging in several different types of audio speakers; then a dialogue box pops up on the computer screen asking whether the speaker is left, right, front, or rear for surround sound installations.  The user's response determines the purpose of the port, which is physically a 1/8" tip-ring-sleeve mini jack.  Some auto-detect ports can even switch between input and output based on context.

As of 2006, manufacturers have nearly standardized colors associated with ports on personal computers, although there are no guarantees.  The following is a short list:

 Orange, purple, or grey: Keyboard PS/2
 Green: Mouse PS/2
 Blue or magenta: Parallel printer DB-25
 Amber: Serial DB-25 or DB-9
 Pastel pink: Microphone 1/8" stereo (TRS) minijack
 Pastel green: Speaker 1/8" stereo (TRS) minijack

FireWire ports used with video equipment (among other devices) can be either 4-pin or 6-pin.  The two extra conductors in the 6-pin connection carry electrical power.  This is why a self-powered device such as a camcorder often connects with a cable that is 4-pins on the camera side and 6-pins on the computer side, the two power conductors simply being ignored.  This is also why laptop computers usually have only 4-pin FireWire ports, as they cannot provide enough power to meet requirements for devices needing the power provided by 6-pin connections.

Optical (light) fiber, microwave, and other technologies (i.e., quantum) have different kinds of connections, as metal wires are not effective for signal transfers with these technologies.  Optical connections are usually a polished glass or plastic interface, possibly with an oil that lessens refraction between the two interface surfaces.  Microwaves are conducted through a pipe, which can be seen on a large scale by examining microwave towers with "funnels" on them leading to pipes.

Hardware port trunking (HPT) is a technology that allows multiple hardware ports to be combined into a single group, effectively creating a single connection with a higher Bandwidth sometimes referred to as a double-barrel approach. This technology also provides a higher degree of fault tolerance because a failure on one port may just mean a slow-down rather than a dropout. By contrast, in software port trunking (SPT), two agents (websites, channels, etc.) are bonded into one with the same effectiveness; i.e., ISDN B1 (64K) plus B2 (64K) equals data throughput of 128K.

Types of ports

Digital Visual Interface

DisplayPort

eSATA

PS/2

Serial

SCSI

USB

See also
 Audio and video connector
 infographic - what PC Ports?

References

External links

TVicHW32, Direct Port I/O from Win32
Interface Ports I/O form PC

 
Out-of-band management